The Galatasaray Islet, is a small island on the Bosphorus strait off Kuruçeşme neighbourhood in Istanbul, Turkey, which is owned by Galatasaray Sports Club.

Its location just north of the Bosphorus Bridge, with the view of the Bosphorus, makes it an attractive facility that houses bars, 6 restaurants and two swimming pools. Only  far from the European coast, the islet is reachable by free ferry service.

In Autumn 2002, construction has started to turn the Galatasaray Islet into one of the most prominent landmarks of the city. Totally rebuilt, it serves since July 2007 the Galatasaray community and Istanbulers as an entertainment and recreation centre.

A fire broke out in the kitchen chimney on 4 October 2007 that burnt down two restaurants and damaged four other premises on the islet.

In 2017, Nilhan Osmanoglu (Sultan Abdulhamid's granddaughter) stated she will claim ownership of the islet in future.

History 

In 1872, Ottoman sultan Abdülaziz (reigned 1861–1876) granted the islet to the Ottoman-Armenian court architect Sarkis Balyan (1835–1899), who erected a three-story house on it as his own residence. In 1874, during one of his several visits to Istanbul, Russian-Armenian painter Ivan Aivazovsky stayed in the mansion of Sarkis on the islet, and made here a number of paintings commissioned by the sultan for the Dolmabahçe Palace.

Called as the "Sarkis Bey Islet" during his lifetime, it was rented out by his legal heirs after the World War I to "Şirket-i Hayriye", the company operating passenger ferries in Istanbul, and was used for a long time as a coal depot.

In 1957, Galatasaray S.K. purchased the islet and constructed premises and sports facilities on it. The swimming pool on the islet served home to the water polo team from 1957 to 1968.

References

External links 
  Galatasaray SK Official Web Site
 Galatasaray Islet on Wikimapia

Galatasaray S.K. facilities
Islands of Istanbul Province
Bosphorus
Restaurants in Istanbul
Islands of the Sea of Marmara
Islands of Turkey